Pluto, in comics, may refer to:

Pluto (Marvel Comics), a Marvel Comics supervillain and fictional god
Pluto (Disney), a Disney character and pet of Mickey Mouse who has appeared in various comic book adaptations
Pluto (Astro Boy), a villain in the Astro Boy manga
Pluto (manga), an Astro Boy spin-off named after the character

See also
Pluto (disambiguation)